{{Infobox comics character| 
| image = Combatron's final armor based on the comics.jpg
| caption = Combatron's final armor based on the comics
| character_name = Combatron
| real_name = Empoy
| publisher =Funny Komiks
| debut = Funny Komiks (1992)
| creators =Berlin Manalaysay
| alliances = Askal, Axel, Metalika, Dobbernaut, General Kipper, Komikus, Death Metal 
| powers = armed with Foot Blades, Space Thunder, Nuclear Eye Beams, Galactic Space sword, Galactic Phoenix
}}

Combatron is a Filipino superhero. Created by Berlin H. Manalaysay, he first appeared in Funny Komiks'' in 1992.

Plot

Origin
 Empoy, an orphaned boy, witnessed a spaceship crash while visiting his parents’ graves. As he approached the crash site, the door of the spaceship opened.  Inside was an injured space warrior from Omnicron, a cyborg named Combatron.  He came to Earth after he and his allies were branded as outlaws. Knowing that his pursuers were coming to Earth, the dying Omnicronian gave Empoy his armor and the robot dog in his employ, named Askal (Asong Mekanikal).

Earth under attack
Suddenly, Empoy realized the reason of the spaceship's crash. It was being chased by another ship containing evil cyborg aliens wearing cybernetic armors. They continued their pursuit and found earth and its inhabitants an easy target to be conquered.

Upon landing, they saw the crashed ship and found Combatron, a fight broke out and Combatron gained the upper hand. The villain returned to their base, warning Combatron that their war isn't over and earth will be conquered.

After then, a series of enemies appear to try to defeat Combatron. He defeats them all, until their leader appears. Combatron was defeated by the leader Abo-dawn, and withdraws to get help. Combatron decides to head for Omicron, the homeworld of the Space Warriors. On the way, he was intercepted by Bogus, a subordinate of Abo-dawn who is a master of illusions and was trapped in a video-game resembling various popular video-games. But an all-out attack from Combatron destroys Bogus and neutralizes the illusion.

A double agent under the alias of Komikus secretly aids Combatron in his struggles. Combatron acquires new powers and allies. He then challenges the leader to a rematch and defeats him. But just when it seems the battles are over a new threat appears in the name of Death Metal.

New Allies
Even before the time of Death Metal's emergence, Combatron has lost his first dog sidekick, Askal, to a villain called Diaconda. He was then replaced by Dobbernaut. Two allies of similar armours also emerged. Axel, in green, and Metallica, in red/pink.

Unstoppable Death Metal
Death Metal is revealed to be the reborn Alchitran, rendered indestructible after being transformed from a comet impact. Searching for revenge against Abo-Dawn and with indirect hostilities against Combatron, Death Metal throws the galaxy into a three-way battle of supremacy.

The new villain also mustered new allies, Quietus, Bracagon, and Helvetica. The sides of war was quickly reduced to two as Abo-Dawn and his forces were easily dealt with by Death Metal. Combatron and his allies, despite fighting valiantly, were also defeated by Death Metal. Combatron used the vortex he was previously sucked into during the battle with a previous enemy (Caligula) and trapped Death Metal temporarily.

Upgrades
Combatron and company took advantage of their precious time and repaired themselves. Combatron himself underwent an upgrade with hip disks and torso as the most noticeable features. Galactic Thunder and Galactic Phoenix were added powers that would prove useful further on their battles.

Round 2 and the "Bigger Enemy"
Metallica, on her way to the comet where Alchitran's original body is to be found, was captured by an even newer threat; a planet that calls himself Megadeath.

Meanwhile, Combatron engaged Death Metal once again. This time around, the battle was more of a stalemate. Their fight, however, was interrupted by a strange light that transferred them directly to the planetoid being; Megadeath, who wanted the two combatants to bow to him. With a common enemy, Combatron and Death Metal vowed allegiance to each other.

Allies
Askal
General Kipper
Dobbernaut
Axel
Metalika
Komikus
Death Metal
Pyrolactus
Mechababe
Armorgeddon

Enemies

Space Warriors
Baragasor
Caligulus
Mauicus
Octopay (With Alchitran as the pilot)
Dakhro
Diaconda
Robot Hunter Caligun
Bogus
Abodawn – leader of the Space Warriors
Baracasor
Bulolicus
Komikus (before he joined Combatron)
Abodawn

Death Metal
Death Metal (formerly Alchitran;before he joined Combatron)
Manticron
Hellvetica
Quietus
Bracagon

Megadeath
Mega Death
Genocide (formerly Quietus)
Evola (formerly Hellvetica)
Baal
Renjardus

Power and Abilities
Combatron possess an array of powers and abilities that were regarded as some of the most powerful in the universe.
Omega Laser
Nuclear Eye Beam
Space Thunder
Teleporter Punch
Galactic Phoenix (after the upgrade)
Galactic Space Strike

Weapons
Combatron Foot Blade
Combatron Hip Disc
Galactic Space Sword
 Galactic Phoenix
 Space Thunder

Berlin Manalaysay's Combatron: The Card Game (2018)
Based on the description of the publisher, the game was based on the one of the most popular comic strips of the 90's from the Philippines legendary "Funny Komiks".

Players choose to fight for good or space domination by picking one of the Space Warriors and their arsenal - Combatron, Metalika, Death Metal or Abodawn.

On a turn a player had to play one card (Power or Assist) and based on what players play, the action will take place.

Power vs Power - Player with the highest total power wins and deals damage to opponent
Power vs Assist - No Damage will be dealt but card effects will still trigger
Assist vs Assist - Both cards will cancel out each others effects.

Each damage will make a Space Warrior more powerful, a 3rd one will bring them their Ultimate! A player must deal 4 damages to defeat their opponent.
A player wins the game by being the last one standing and by then they will be called as the most powerful Space Warrior!

Unfinished story
On December 15, 1997, Combatron was shut down by Pilipino Funny Komiks Publisher Islas Filipinas Publishing due to excessive violence.

Interview on Kapuso Mo Jessica Soho - October 12, 2014
"Combatron was shut down because Berlin Manalaysay became busy with his work in advertising."

The Real Ending
Finally after twenty (20) years, the closure to the story was released into a 2-part colored limited edition comic book. Part 1 was released on 2018 and lastly, part 2 which was titled "The Galactic End" (also an Augmented Reality 56-page comic) was released on 2019.

Collected editions

See also
List of Filipino superheroes

References

External links

Project Combatron
Combatron Facebook Page
Combatron at International Catalogue of Superheroes
Combatron at Comic Vine

Comics characters introduced in 1990
Superheroes
Filipino superheroes
Filipino comics characters